Longvilliers (until 1997 Longvillers) is a commune in the Pas-de-Calais department in the Hauts-de-France region of France.

Geography
Longvilliers is situated 5 miles (9 km) north of Montreuil-sur-Mer on the D146 road and in the Dordonne river valley. With a population of little over 250, it retains the character and atmosphere of the French countryside. There are no shops, but it is near enough to Frencq (5 km), Montreuil-sur-Mer (9 km) and Étaples (10 km). The area around offers views and walks in the countryside.

Population

Places of interest
 The fifteenth-century church.
 Ruins of the 16th-century château.
 Vestiges of a cistercian abbey from the twelfth century.
 Remains of the manor of Tatéville, of 1586.

See also
Communes of the Pas-de-Calais department

References

Communes of Pas-de-Calais